Lovettsville Historic District is a national historic district located at Lovettsville, Loudoun County, Virginia. It contains 174 contributing buildings, 5 contributing sites, and 2 contributing structures in a primarily residential section of Lovettsville. Most contributing resources consist of residences and associated outbuildings dating from the early-19th to early-20th centuries. They are vernacular interpretations of  a variety of popular architectural styles including Federal, Queen Anne, Italianate, Romanesque, and Bungalow. Notable resources include the Lovettsville Union Cemetery, First German Reformed Church site and cemetery, New Jerusalem Lutheran Church (1869, 1903) and cemetery, Union Cemetery, African-American Methodist Episcopal Church (c. 1870) and cemetery, Presbyterian cemetery, Lovettsville Masonic Lodge (1869, 1923), former Grubbs Store (c. 1870), former Red Men's Lodge (1923), and Willard Hall (c. 1820).

It was listed on the National Register of Historic Places in 2012.

References

Historic districts on the National Register of Historic Places in Virginia
Federal architecture in Virginia
Queen Anne architecture in Virginia
Romanesque Revival architecture in Virginia
Italianate architecture in Virginia
Buildings and structures in Loudoun County, Virginia
National Register of Historic Places in Loudoun County, Virginia